Tyler Paul Myers (born February 1, 1990) is an American-born Canadian professional ice hockey defenceman for the Vancouver Canucks of the National Hockey League (NHL).  He was drafted by the Buffalo Sabres in the first round, 12th overall, in the 2008 NHL Entry Draft. At the end of the 2009–10 season, Myers won the Calder Memorial Trophy as the NHL's best rookie. Standing at 6 feet 8 inches tall, he is the tallest active player in the NHL and is nicknamed "The Big Easy" or "Big Tex" because he was born in  Houston, Texas.

Born in Houston, Texas, Myers grew up in Calgary, Alberta. He has opted to play internationally for Canada. Representing Canada twice as a junior and once on the men's team, he has won gold medals at the 2008 IIHF World U18 Championships and 2009 World Junior Championships.

Playing career

Junior
In the 2005 Western Hockey League (WHL) Bantam Draft, Myers was the Kelowna Rockets first round selection, 19th overall. Prior to playing in the WHL, Myers continued minor hockey at Athol Murray College of Notre Dame with the Hounds, a AAA midget team. Myers began his major junior career with the Rockets in 2005–06. Following his NHL draft year in 2007–08, Myers was ranked fourth among North American draft-eligible skaters by the NHL's Central Scouting Services.

He was selected 12th overall by the Buffalo Sabres in the 2008 NHL Entry Draft, after they traded the LA Kings a third-round pick to move up from the 13th spot. The following season, Myers helped the Rockets to a 2009 Ed Chynoweth Cup championship following a junior career-high 42-point regular season. Scoring 20 points during the Rockets playoff run, Myers was instrumental the franchise's third WHL title and was selected as the WHL Playoff MVP. Following Myers' WHL championship win with the Rockets, he was signed to a three-year, entry-level contract with the Buffalo Sabres on May 11, 2009.

Professional

Buffalo Sabres

Myers started the 2009–10 season with the Buffalo Sabres. He recorded his first NHL point, an assist, on October 8, 2009, against the Phoenix Coyotes. Eight days later, Myers scored his first NHL goal against Dwayne Roloson of the New York Islanders. It was also his first multi-point game, as he recorded an assist as well. On October 24, Myers was used in the sixth round of a shootout against the Tampa Bay Lightning and scored the game winner. After a strong first nine games with the Sabres, the club decided to keep him in Buffalo rather than return him to the Rockets, initiating the first year of his contract.

Myers quickly established himself as the top defenseman on the Sabres roster, leading the club in average ice time per game in his rookie season. On December 16, 2009, he registered 28:32 of ice time in a regulation loss to the Ottawa Senators despite being one of a much-publicized group of Sabres players struck with food poisoning the night before. The following month, Myers recorded his first multi-goal game on January 8, 2010. He scored twice on the powerplay, including the game-winner, as the Sabres beat the Toronto Maple Leafs 3–2. He also assisted Tim Kennedy on the Sabres' first goal.

Scoring 10 points and leading all rookies in average ice time (24 minutes and 42 seconds per game) for contests in January 2010, Myers was named the NHL Rookie of the Month. He completed his first NHL season leading league rookie defensemen, as well as Sabres defensemen, playing every game that season with 11 goals and 37 assists adding up to a career high of 48 points and getting 1 point in the playoffs from 1 goal. In the off-season, Myers was awarded with the Calder Memorial Trophy on June 23, 2010 at the NHL Awards Ceremony in Las Vegas, beating out forward Matt Duchene of the Colorado Avalanche and goaltender Jimmy Howard of the Detroit Red Wings.

On November 15, 2010 Myers scored his fifth goal of the season in a 4–3 overtime win against the Vancouver Canucks. Myers got another overtime goal in a 3–2 win against the Florida Panthers on February 10, 2011. Myers finished the season missing only 2 games with 10 goals and 27 assists adding up to 37 points and getting 6 points in the playoffs from 1 goal and 5 assists. On September 15, 2011 the Sabres signed Myers to a 7-year, $38.5 million contract. On March 13, 2012, Myers was suspended for 3 games for boarding Montreal Canadiens forward Scott Gomez on March 12, 2012. On October 14, 2012, Myers signed with Klagenfurt AC of the Austrian Erste Bank Hockey League during the 2012 NHL lockout.

On April 12, 2013, the Sabres announced that Myers had broken a bone in his leg during the team's 5–1 loss to the Montreal Canadiens the night before and would miss the remainder of the season.

Winnipeg Jets
On February 11, 2015, Myers, Drew Stafford, Brendan Lemieux, Joel Armia and a conditional first-round pick (used to select Jack Roslovic) in the 2015 NHL Entry Draft, were traded to the Winnipeg Jets in exchange for Evander Kane, Zach Bogosian and the rights to Jason Kasdorf.

Myers’ 2015-16 season was ended early by hip and knee surgeries announced by the Jets on March 24, 2016.

During the 2016–17 season, Myers would play in 11 games before he suffered an undisclosed lower-body injury (unrelated to the hip and knee surgeries he had the previous offseason) in a 3–2 overtime loss to the Colorado Avalanche on November 11, 2016. Surgery was not initially expected to be required, however after being out of the lineup for 3 months, it was announced that Myers would in fact have surgery to repair the lower body injury, ending Myers second consecutive season due to surgery.

Myers would stay healthy for the duration of the 2017–18 season, playing in all 82 regular season games for the first time since his rookie season, and scoring 6 goals and 30 assists for 36 points while averaging 21:26 of ice time as the Jets finished 2nd in the Central Division, and made the playoffs for the first time since 2014–15. The Jets ultimately made it to the Western Conference Final, losing to the Vegas Golden Knights in five games.

Vancouver Canucks
On July 1, 2019, Myers signed as a free agent to a five-year, $30 million contract with the Vancouver Canucks. Later, on December 7, 2019 Myers scored his first goal as a member of the Canucks in a 6–5 overtime win versus the visiting Buffalo Sabres, one of Myers' former teams.

International play

Despite being born in Houston, Texas, Myers plays internationally for Team Canada, as he moved to Calgary, Alberta when he was 10 years old and holds dual citizenship. Making the decision in his youth, he has credited moving to Canada as a large influence in his development as a hockey player, stating he would "be playing a different sport had I stayed in Texas,” presumably basketball as many NHL and analysts from other sports leagues have speculated. 

Myers was a part of the national team that earned gold at the 2008 IIHF World U18 Championships in Kazan, Russia. He was later named to the Canadian under-20 team for the 2009 World Junior Championships in Ottawa, along with Kelowna Rockets teammate Jamie Benn, and helped Canada to a record-tying fifth straight gold medal. On April 29, 2010, Myers was named to the Team Canada roster for the 2010 IIHF World Championship. He was part of a young squad that finished without a medal.

Personal life
Myers was born on February 1, 1990, to parents Tonja Stelly and Paul Myers III. When Myers was 6-years-old his father took him to his first hockey game, watching the Houston Aeros of the International Hockey League. Myers quickly became interested in the game after watching it, and started to play soon after. In 2000 Paul moved to Calgary, with Tyler joining him; Tyler would later acquire Canadian citizenship.

His younger maternal half-brother, Quentin Grimes, is an American professional basketball player for the New York Knicks. Grimes and Myers are the first set of brothers to play in the NHL and NBA.

Myers and his wife Michela were married in 2014. The couple have two children together.

Career statistics

Regular season and playoffs

International

Awards and honors

References

External links

1990 births
Living people
American emigrants to Canada
American men's ice hockey defensemen
Athol Murray College of Notre Dame alumni
Buffalo Sabres draft picks
Buffalo Sabres players
Calder Trophy winners
Canadian ice hockey defencemen
Ice hockey people from Texas
Kelowna Rockets players
EC KAC players
National Hockey League first-round draft picks
Ice hockey people from Calgary
Sportspeople from Houston
Vancouver Canucks players
Winnipeg Jets players